The Silver Sword is a children's novel written by Ian Serraillier and published in the United Kingdom by Jonathan Cape in 1956 and then by Puffin Books in 1960. It has also been published in the United States under the title Escape From Warsaw.

The story is based on fact, although fictional names are given to a few of the places mentioned. The account of the Red Army on the march is derived from eyewitness accounts in Jan Stransky's East Wind over Prague. In an Afterword to the 2003 edition Jane Serraillier Grossfeld, the author's daughter, identifies a Picture Post article about the Pestalozzi children's village as a source. The Silver Sword has been adapted for television and radio.

Plot summary 
“Joseph Balicki", the headmaster of a primary school in Warsaw, was arrested by German soldiers in early 1940, a few months into the Second World War, and taken away to a prison camp hundreds of miles away in the Polish highlands. His primary school was taken over and the students forced to be taught in German. Pictures of Adolf Hitler had been put up around the school, and Joseph had secretly turned one of these pictures around to face the wall while he was teaching. Someone had reported this to the Germans and as a result, he was taken from his house to the prison camp on a cold winter's night. His Swiss wife, Margrit, and three children (Ruth aged nearly 13, Edek 11, and Bronia 3) were left behind to fend for themselves and survive. He spent more than a year in prison before escaping; he then set off to his hometown.

Having fled his prison camp after knocking out a guard and stealing his uniform, Joseph arrived at a house in a village across the valley from the prison camp and took shelter with an elderly couple living there. They were at first confused by his Polish appearance and speech, as well as with his German uniform, but they accepted him as a friend after he told them about what had happened to him and showed them the prison number ZAK 2473 branded on his arm as proof. Shortly after his arrival, they heard the prison camp "escape bell" ringing in the distance, and he realised his escape must have been detected. German soldiers arrived the next day searching for the escapee but Joseph had hidden up a chimney to avoid being captured or shot. Two soldiers had entered the house and they fired bullets up the chimney to discover if anyone was hiding there but they fled the house (fearful of ruining their uniforms) after dislodging a heap of soot. Joseph spent two weeks in the house before beginning the long journey back to Warsaw.

When Joseph eventually reached Warsaw, he barely recognised the city due to extensive bombing. He eventually found the ruins of his house and then found a paper knife – the 'Silver Sword' – that he once gave to Margrit as a present. He was being watched by a boy who wanted to have the silver sword as the ruins were "his place". Joseph allowed the boy (who he eventually learned was called Jan, a master pickpocket), to keep it on the condition that if he ever came across his children that he would tell them that he has gone to Switzerland and they should also make for there. 

Joseph learns from a neighbour that the Nazis had captured his wife and taken her away to work on the land, and then returned to set the house on fire after someone had fired gunshots at them from an upstairs room. The children had not been seen since, and were feared to have died in the fire, although Joseph is still hopeful that they might be alive somewhere, as their bodies were not found.

Jan then helped Joseph find a goods train going towards Germany, on which Joseph made his escape from Poland to Switzerland.

Shortly after Joseph was taken to the prison camp, German soldiers had broken into the family house and taken his wife away, after the Germans had called for 1 million foreign workers to be taken to their country for the war effort. Edek had fired shots at the van in a bid to stop them from getting away. Ruth had admonished Edek for his foolishness and decided that they had to escape to avoid being captured or killed, so the children climbed along the rooftops of the adjacent houses and watched from a distance as their house was blown up by the Nazis.

The three children then spent the winter living in the cellar of a bombed-out house on the other side of Warsaw, and the summer living in woodlands outside the city. Ruth started a school for the children living in the vicinity, whilst Edek fell in with black market dealers, and regularly stole food and clothes for his sisters and the other children living with them, until one evening he failed to return. Ruth eventually discovered that Edek had called at a house where the Germans were searching for hoarded goods. They had then captured Edek as well as the house owner and set the house on fire before driving away with their captives.

In 1944, Warsaw was liberated by the Russians, but there was still no news of Edek's whereabouts or of the children's parents. Ruth and Bronia were still living in the city in a new shelter, and one day Bronia found an older boy lying in the street. He introduced himself as Jan, and in his possession he had a wooden box, the contents of which he kept secret.

Ruth befriended Ivan, a Russian sentry, who had been assigned to liaise with the civilian population. He gave her various supplies and became a good friend. He eventually managed to find out that Edek was in Posen, having escaped from the German labour camp where he had been held. When he visited Ruth and Bronia in their bomb shelter home with the good news about Edek, he was attacked by Jan as he was a soldier and in the melee, his wooden box was broken. As a result, Ruth recognized one of the contents of the box, the silver sword. Jan then told them about meeting her father and his message of him going to Switzerland. Ruth, Bronia, and Jan then made their way to Posen and eventually found Edek at a refugee feeding station; he was suffering from tuberculosis.

Once Ruth, Bronia, and Edek were reunited, they (in company with Jan) travelled by train to Berlin, intent on finding their parents. They arrived in the city during May 1945, shortly after the end of the Second World War in Europe and the death of Adolf Hitler. They stayed in a disused cinema, but Jan soon went missing in pursuit of an escaped chimpanzee, which had managed to flee from the zoo. Jan was able to befriend the chimpanzee and help it to be 
recaptured. He also crossed paths with a British Army officer named Mark, who wrote a letter to his wife about the chimpanzee and its antics. 

The children made then made their way south through Germany. Edek, whose health was steadily worsening with tuberculosis, was arrested while following Jan – who had been stealing food from several American trains bringing supplies to the troops. Both boys were prosecuted by the military tribunal, but Edek was cleared of any crimes whilst Jan led a spirited defence, claiming that certain American troops were equally guilty of stealing from the conquered Germans. Nonetheless Jan was sentenced to a week's detention. Upon his release the children continued south and were taken in by a Bavarian farmer. All of the children were put to work on the farm except Edek, who assisted the farmer's wife with light chores.

The children spent several weeks working and recuperating at the farm. During their stay, the farmer heard of an edict by the Americans that all foreigners in the area were to be rounded up and returned to their home country. This task was under the authority of the burgomaster. One day the burgomaster crashed his car outside the farm. Edek volunteered to help him fix the damage, deceiving the man by speaking German, but Bronia unwittingly asked a question in Polish, which betrayed the children's identity. The burgomaster later visited the farm and told Kurt that he knew that the children were illegally working on his farm and that they would have to be sent back to Poland. 

To avoid sending the children back, Kurt helped them escape in two canoes via the local river, a tributary of the River Danube. Before they left, Kurt's pet dog, Ludwig had hidden inside Jan and Edek's canoe and stayed with them on their journey south.  Intent on reaching the River Danube, the children paddled along the River Falkenberg and overcame a series of hazards, including an encounter with a soldier who fired some shots at Ruth and Bronia. They managed to escape and reach the Danube.

After their canoe journey, Jan noticed that they had left the Silver Sword back at Kurt's house. This news caused Edek's condition to take a turn for the worse. Jan and the dog went missing in the night but Ruth, Edek and Bronia continued south towards Switzerland, with Edek getting weaker day by day. They then met an American G.I. lorry driver named Joe Wolski, who was originally from Poland. He gave the children a lift in his lorry to a Red Cross camp on the north bank of Lake Constance, with Switzerland being on the south bank. He joked that a hyena and a bear were in the back of his truck, but when he opened the back of the truck a tied-up Jan and the dog, Ludwig, was inside.

At the camp, the children spoke to the camp superintendent and told him of their quest to get to Switzerland. He would not let them cross over the Lake without authority from the Swiss side. However, he later changed his view when he received confirmation from their father, who was now in Switzerland. The superintendent had also received a letter from the International Tracing Service who had received a letter from Kurt, along with the Silver Sword. Ruth was able to talk to her father on the telephone and he told her that he would come over on the ferry to collect them and take them back to Switzerland.

On the day that he was due to collect them, it had not rained for several weeks and there were storm clouds in the sky. The children decided to walk to an outcrop along the shore of the lake to see the boat coming across the lake. They crossed a dried up stream to get to the outcrop, but Edek was feeling tired, so they left him on the other side of the stream resting in an old boat. Before they could reach the outcrop a gigantic thunderstorm broke, sending down a heavy downpour which turned the stream into a raging torrent. They then saw Edek in the boat out on the lake and Ludwig going berserk with fear behind them. They managed to get into a boat that had come downstream and try and rescue Edek. Ruth fainted but Jan chose to rescue Edek and leave the dog to his fate.
     
When Ruth woke up, she was finally reunited with her father and then her mother in Switzerland, along with Edek, Bronia and Jan. Jan's record was sent to the authorities, but his parents were never traced and the Balickis granted his request to adopt him.

In 1946, the Balickis were put in charge of a Polish House in an International Children's Village in Switzerland. Bronia developed a talent for art and drew numerous pictures of war scenes; Edek spent two years recovering from tuberculosis and went on to become an engineer; Jan mended his thieving ways, and was regularly called upon to care for sick animals, while Ruth became a teacher, married a Frenchman and started a family of her own.

Adaptations
The BBC produced an eight-part children's television series in 1957, at the Lime Grove Studios in London, and a further BBC television version was produced in the early 1970s. Both of these serials are thought to survive in some capacity (the final episode of the 1957 serial is definitely known to exist). In 2011, a year before the centenary of the author's birth, a radio adaptation was produced for BBC Radio 4 Extra.

Legacy
John Boyne, author of The Boy in the Striped Pyjamas (2006), has acknowledged a debt to Serraillier's novel: "the book stands out for me as a great children's classic – [it] was my first introduction to the Second World War in fiction, to the horrors of the Nazi era, and the fear that capture could instill in the minds of its young heroes Ruth, Edek and Bronia."

References

1956 British novels
Children's historical novels
Novels set during World War II
Jonathan Cape books
Novels set in Poland
British children's novels
1956 children's books